Mansarovar is a colony in the city of Jaipur in the Indian state of Rajasthan. It was Asia's largest colony till 2010.

Police stations 
The following Police Stations of Jaipur Police serve this area:
 Mansarovar Police Station, Varun Path
 Shipra Path Police Station, Aravali Marg

References

Neighbourhoods in Jaipur
Areas of Jaipur